Noh Jung-yoon (born March 28, 1971) is a South Korean footballer who spent almost his whole career in the J1 League, with a spell in the Dutch League. The midfielder was the first Korean player to play in the J1 League when he moved to Japan in 1992 when the J1 League was newly formed.

The former South Korea national team midfielder has played for Sanfrecce Hiroshima, NAC Breda, Cerezo Osaka, and Avispa Fukuoka.

Club statistics

National team statistics

Results list South Korea's goal tally first.

References

External links
 
 

 
 National Team Player Record 

1971 births
Living people
Association football midfielders
South Korean footballers
South Korean expatriate footballers
South Korea international footballers
Sanfrecce Hiroshima players
NAC Breda players
Cerezo Osaka players
Avispa Fukuoka players
Busan IPark players
Ulsan Hyundai FC players
J1 League players
J2 League players
Eredivisie players
K League 1 players
Expatriate footballers in Japan
Expatriate footballers in the Netherlands
1994 FIFA World Cup players
1998 FIFA World Cup players
2000 CONCACAF Gold Cup players
2000 AFC Asian Cup players
Footballers at the 1992 Summer Olympics
Olympic footballers of South Korea
Sportspeople from Incheon
South Korean expatriate sportspeople in Japan
South Korean expatriate sportspeople in the Netherlands
Asian Games medalists in football
Footballers at the 1990 Asian Games
Footballers at the 1994 Asian Games
Asian Games bronze medalists for South Korea
Medalists at the 1990 Asian Games